Zenda may refer to:

Places
 Zenda, Ontario, a small village in Ontario, Canada
 Zenda, Kansas, a small town in Kansas, United States
 Zenda, Wisconsin, a small community in Wisconsin, United States
 Zenda, Virginia, a small community in the Shenandoah Valley, founded by newly freed slaves

Arts
 Zenda (film), a film
 Zenda (musical), a musical

Other uses 
 Zenda (horse), a racehorse
 USS Zenda (SP-688), a patrol vessel that served in the United States Navy from 1917 to 1919

See also
 The Prisoner of Zenda, an 1894 novel by Anthony Hope which later became a play
 Zendaman, a Japanese anime television series and the third season of the series Time Bokan
 Zenda, a main antagonist of Prezzemolo